The 1992–93 Libyan Premier League was the 24th edition of the competition since its inception in 1963. 19 teams contested the league, with Ahly Benghazi the champions. There was no relegation as the league expanded to 21 teams the following season. The league went to a play off match between Tripoli rivals Ahly and Ittihad, as both were level on points after 36 games. Ahly Tripoli won 2–0 to win their 7th league title and their first for 9 years.

League table

Results

Championship playoff
As Ahly & Ittihad were tied on points, the league title went to a one-off playoff match. The match was played at the 28 March Stadium in Benghazi.

References

Libya - List of final tables (RSSSF)

Libyan Premier League seasons
1
Libya